Nasir is an Iranian naval cruise missile, which was fired during a major naval exercise called "Welayat-95" in southern waters of Iran. This cruise missile is manufactured by the Ministry of Defence and Armed Forces Logistics (Iran). According to the (former) minister of defense (of Iran), among its features are:

Having high readiness and reaction speed, low flight altitude, high accuracy in navigation and hitting targets, the high ability of this missile to destroy targets, having high anti-jamming ability due to its advanced radar, and so on.

Unveiling 
Nasir which is said to be the newest Iranians naval cruise missile, was formally unveiled on 15 April 2017 during the survey of Iran's president from the exhibition of the achievements of the Ministry of Defense on 22 April 2017, and it was handed over in bulk to the Islamic Revolutionary Guard Corps on May 2, 2017.

See also 
 List of military equipment manufactured in Iran
 Armed Forces of the Islamic Republic of Iran
 Islamic Revolutionary Guard Corps
 Noor (missile)
 Nasr-e Basir
 Nasr-1
 Qader (missile)
 Meshkat (missile)
 Ghadir (missile)

References 

Post–Cold War weapons of Iran
Military equipment of Iran
Anti-ship missiles of Iran
Cruise missiles of Iran